The 2018 GEICO 500 was a Monster Energy NASCAR Cup Series race held on April 29, 2018, at Talladega Superspeedway in Lincoln, Alabama. Contested over 188 laps on the 2.66 mile (4.28 km) superspeedway, it was the 10th race of the 2018 Monster Energy NASCAR Cup Series season.

Report

Background

Talladega Superspeedway, formerly known as Alabama International Motor Speedway, is a motorsports complex located north of Talladega, Alabama. It is located on the former Anniston Air Force Base in the small city of Lincoln. A tri-oval, the track was constructed in 1969 by the International Speedway Corporation, a business controlled by the France family. Talladega is most known for its steep banking. The track currently hosts NASCAR's Monster Energy NASCAR Cup Series, Xfinity Series and Camping World Truck Series. Talladega is the longest NASCAR oval with a length of 2.66-mile-long (4.28 km) tri-oval like the Daytona International Speedway, which is a 2.5-mile-long (4.0 km).

Entry list

Practice

First practice

Final practice
The practice was marred by a three-car crash on the back-straightaway that resulted in McMurray barrel rolling several times into the inside catchfence while Ty Dillon and Ryan Newman were also involved. “When I realized I was going to flip, I actually shut my eyes because I don't really want to see what's getting ready to happen,” McMurray said. “And then it just kept, it seemed like forever. I opened my eyes a couple times and I couldn't, I'm like I don't know if I'm going up or down or where it's going to hit next. So I was just thankful when it finally ... a couple of times I thought it was going to stop and it just kind of kept going.” McMurray's accident led to NASCAR reducing the restrictor plates from 7/8th to 55/64th of an inch.

Qualifying

Qualifying results

Race

Stage Results

Stage 1
Laps: 55

Stage 2
Laps: 55

Final Stage Results

Stage 3
Laps: 78

Race statistics
 Lead changes: 16 among different drivers
 Cautions/Laps: 6 for 29
 Red flags: 0
 Time of race: 3 hours, 16 minutes and 46 seconds
 Average speed:

Media

Television
Fox Sports covered their 18th race at the Talladega Superspeedway. Mike Joy, six-time Talladega winner – and all-time restrictor plate race wins record holder – Jeff Gordon and four-time Talladega winner Darrell Waltrip called the race in the booth for the race. Jamie Little, Vince Welch and Matt Yocum handled the action on pit road for the television side.

Radio
MRN had the radio call for the race which was also simulcast on Sirius XM NASCAR Radio. Joe Moore, Jeff Striegle and Rusty Wallace called the race in the booth when the field raced through the tri-oval. Dave Moody called the race from the Sunoco spotters stand outside turn 2 when the field raced through turns 1 and 2. Mike Bagley called the race from a platform inside the backstretch when the field raced down the backstretch. Kyle Rickey called the race from the Sunoco spotters stand outside turn 4 when the field raced through turns 3 and 4. Alex Hayden, Winston Kelley, Kim Coon, and Steve Post worked pit road for the radio side.

Standings after the race

Drivers' Championship standings

Manufacturers' Championship standings

Note: Only the first 16 positions are included for the driver standings.
. – Driver has clinched a position in the Monster Energy NASCAR Cup Series playoffs.

References

GEICO 500
GEICO 500
GEICO 500
NASCAR races at Talladega Superspeedway